Neper is an old lunar impact crater located near the eastern limb of the Moon. Due to its location the crater must be viewed during a suitable libration, and is very foreshortened. The crater lies on the south edge of Mare Marginis, to the east of the crater Jansky. To the northwest across the Mare Marginis is the crater Goddard.

The crater inner walls have worn terraces, with low rim edges at the northern and southern extremes. The crater floor is dark and flat, with a central peak and several crater impacts near the west rim. The most notable of these is a small crater near the north-northwestern edge.

It is named after the Scottish mathematician, physicist, astronomer and astrologer John Napier.

Satellite craters
By convention these features are identified on lunar maps by placing the letter on the side of the crater midpoint that is closest to Neper.

The following craters have been renamed by the IAU.

 Neper G - See Virchow (crater).
 Neper K - See Tacchini (crater).

References

 
 
 
 
 
 
 
 
 
 
 
 

Impact craters on the Moon